Syrynia  (German Syrin) is a village in the administrative district of Gmina Lubomia, within Wodzisław County, Silesian Voivodeship, in southern Poland.

The village has a population of 3,074.

References

Syrynia